Severin Ntahomvukiye (born 1944) is a Burundian politician. He served as foreign minister of Burundi from 1998 - 2001.

References

Living people
1944 births
Foreign ministers of Burundi
Place of birth missing (living people)